Events in the year 2017 in El Salvador.

Incumbents
 President: Salvador Sánchez Cerén
 Vice President: Óscar Ortiz

Events

Sport
Continuing form 2016: the 2016–17 Copa El Salvador
Continuing form 2016: the 2016–17 Primera División de Fútbol Profesional season
Continuing form 2016: the 2016–17 Segunda División de Fútbol Salvadoreño

Deaths
 
26 February – "Gustavito", hippopotamus from El Salvador National Zoological Park (b. 2002).
27 February – Carlos Humberto Romero, politician (b. 1924).

References

 
Years of the 21st century in El Salvador
El Salvador
El Salvador
2010s in El Salvador